The following is a list of water parks in the Americas sorted by region.

North America

The Bahamas 
 Aquaventure, Nassau (part of Atlantis Paradise Island)
 Baha Bay Water Park (part of Grand Hyatt Baha Mar)
 Castaway Cay
 CocoCay

Canada

Alberta 
 World Waterpark, Edmonton

British Columbia 
 Big Splash Water Park, Tsawwassen
 Bridal Falls Waterpark, Rosedale
 Cultus Lake
 Splashdown Vernon, Spallumcheen

Manitoba 
 Fun Mountain, Springfield

New Brunswick 
 Magic Mountain, Moncton

Ontario 

 Adventure Bay Family Water Park, Windsor
 Bingemans, Kitchener
 Cedar Park Resort, Hampton
 Calypso Park, Limoges
 East Park, London
 Fallsview Indoor Waterpark, Niagara Falls
 Great Wolf Lodge, Niagara Falls
 Polar Splash, Marineland of Canada, Niagara Falls
 Splash Island, Toronto Zoo, Toronto
 Splash Works, Canada's Wonderland, Vaughan
 Waves Indoor Water Park, Niagara Falls
 Wet'n'Wild Toronto, Brampton
 Wild WaterWorks, Hamilton

Quebec 
 Amazoo, Granby
 Bora Parc, Saint-Gabriel-de-Valcartier
 Mont Cascades, Cantley
 Mont Saint-Sauveur, Saint-Saveur
 Super Aqua Club in Pointe-Calumet
 Village Vacances Valcartier, Saint-Gabriel-de-Valcartier

Saskatchewan 
 Kenosee Superslides, Kenosee Lake

Costa Rica 
 Kalambu Hot Springs, La Fortuna, San Carlos

Dominican Republic
 Aqua Nick, Nickelodeon Hotels & Resorts Punta Cana, Punta Cana
 Los Delfines Water & Entertainment Park Juan Dolio – opened in 2013
 Memories Splash, Punta Cana

Guatemala 
 Xocomil

Honduras 
 Iguanas Water Park, Catacamas
 Villamar Park, Comayagua
 Water Jungle, Salitran
 Zizima Eco Water Park, San Pedro Sula

Jamaica 
 Kool Runnings Waterpark, Negril
 Pirates Island Waterpark, Beaches Resorts, Negril and Ocho Rios

Mexico 

 Agua Caliente, Jalisco
 Aqua Splash, Morelos
 Chimulco Water Park, Jalisco
 El Rollo Morelos
 Maya, Lost Mayan Kingdom, Mahahual
 Parque Acuático Cici Acapulco Mágico, Acapulco
 Parque Acuático Corral Grande, Guadalajara
 Parque Acuático Ixtapan, State of Mexico
 Parque Acuático Mundo A, Aguascalientes
 Parque Acuático Tepetongo, Michoacán
 Parque Acuático Temixco, Morelos
 Tephe, Hidalgo
 Wet 'n Wild Cancun, Ventura Park, Riviera Maya
 Xcaret Park, Quintana Roo
 Xel-Ha Park, Quintana Roo

Puerto Rico 
 Coqui Water Park, Fajardo (part of El Conquistador Resort)
 El Tuque, Ponce
 Las Cascadas Water Park, Aguadilla
 Surf 'N Fun Water Park, San Germán

St. Lucia 
 Coconut Bay Beach Resort & Spa, Vieux Fort Quarter

Turks and Caicos Islands 
 Pirates Island Waterpark, Beaches Resorts, Turks & Caicos

United States

Alabama 
 Alabama Splash Adventure, Bessemer
 Fayette Aquatic Center, Fayette
 Guin Water Park, Guin
 Hartselle Aquatic Center, Hartselle
 Indoor Water Park at OWA, Foley
 Pirate's Bay, Leesburg
 Point Mallard Aquatic Center, Decatur
 Red Bay Water Park, Red Bay
 Southern Adventures, Huntsville
 Spring Valley Beach, Blountsville
 Water World, Dothan
 Waterville USA, Gulf Shores

Alaska 
 H2Oasis, Anchorage

Arizona 
 Breakers Water Park, Marana
 Enchanted Island, Phoenix
 Funtasticks Family Fun Park, Tucson
 Golfland Sunsplash, Mesa
 Great Wolf Lodge, Scottsdale
 Mesquite Groves Aquatic Center, Chandler
 Oasis Water Park, Phoenix
 Six Flags Hurricane Harbor Phoenix, Phoenix
 Waylon's Water World, Yuma

Arkansas 
 Alma Aquatic Park, Alma
 Arkadelphia Aquatic Park, Arkadelphia
 Cabot Aquatic Park, Cabot
 Clarksville Aquatic Center, Clarksville
 Crenshaw Springs Water Park, White Hall
 Holiday Springs Water Park, Texarkana
 Magic Springs and Crystal Falls, Hot Springs
 Parrot Island Waterpark, Fort Smith
 Rogers Aquatic Center, Rogers
 Willow Springs Water Park, Little Rock

California 
 Alpine Slide at Magic Mountain, Big Bear Lake
 Antioch Water Park, Antioch
 Aqua Adventure, Fremont
 Blackbeard's Family Entertainment Center, Fresno
 Buccaneer Cove at Castle Park, Riverside
 Camelot Golfland, Anaheim
 Casitas Water Adventure, Ventura
 DropZone Waterpark, Perris
 Dry Town Water Park, Palmdale
 Fiesta Village Family Fun Park, Colton
 Gilroy Gardens, Gilroy
 Golfland Emerald Hills, San Jose
 Golfland Sunsplash, Roseville
 Great Wolf Lodge, Garden Grove
 Great Wolf Lodge, Manteca
 Islands Water Park, Fresno
 Knott's Soak City, Buena Park
 Legoland Water Park, Carlsbad
 Mulligan Family Fun Center, Murrieta
 Mustang Waterpark, Arroyo Grande
 Raging Waters Sacramento, Sacramento
 Raging Waters San Dimas, San Dimas
 Raging Waters San Jose, San Jose
 Ravine Waterpark, Paso Robles
 Sesame Place, San Diego
 Six Flags Hurricane Harbor, Valencia
 Six Flags Hurricane Harbor Concord, Concord
 South Bay Shores, Santa Clara (closing by 2033)
 Splash! La Mirada Aquatics Center, La Mirada
 Splash Pad Park, Oakland
 The Cove Waterpark, Riverside
 The Dublin Wave, Dublin
 The Palm Springs Surf Club, Palm Springs
 The Wave Waterpark, Vista
 WaterWorks Park, Redding
 Wild Rivers (water park), Irvine
 Wild Water Adventure Park, Clovis

Colorado 
 Adventure Island, Greeley
 Bay Aquatic Park, Broomfield
 Brighton Oasis Family Aquatic Park, Colorado Springs
 Island Kingdom, Denver
 Glenwood Hot Springs Pool, Glenwood Springs
 Great Wolf Lodge, Colorado Springs
 Pirates Cove, Littleton
 The Great Outdoors, Lafayette
 Water World, Federal Heights

Connecticut 
 Lake Compounce, Bristol
 Ocean Beach Park, New London
 Splash Away Bay Water Park, Middlebury

Delaware 
 Jungle Jim's Adventure World, Rehoboth Beach
 Killens Pond, Felton
 Midway Speedway Park, Rehoboth Beach
 Thunder Lagoon, Fenwick Island

Florida 

 Adventure Island, Tampa
 Adventure Landing, Jacksonville Beach
 Aquatica, Orlando
 Big Kahuna's, Destin
 Buccaneer Bay at Weeki Wachee Springs, Weeki Wachee
 Calypso Bay, Royal Palm Beach
 CoCo Key Water Resort, Orlando
 Daytona Lagoon, Daytona Beach
 Disney's Blizzard Beach, Bay Lake (part of Walt Disney World)
 Disney's Typhoon Lagoon, Lake Buena Vista (part of Walt Disney World)
 Flamingo Waterpark Hotel & Resort, Kissimmee
 Island H2O Live!, Kissimee
 Legoland Water Park, Winter Haven
 Lion Country Safari, Loxahatchee
 Paradise Cove, Pembroke Pines
 Rapids Water Park, West Palm Beach
 Reunion Resort Water Park, Kissimee
 Sailfish Splash Waterpark, Stuart
 Sam's Surf City, Pensacola
 Shipwreck Island Waterpark, Jacksonville Beach
 Shipwreck Island Waterpark, Panama City Beach
 Ship Wreck Island, Kissimmee
 Splash Harbour, Indian Rocks Beach
 Sun Splash Family Waterpark, Cape Coral, Florida
 Sun-N-Fun Lagoon, Naples, Florida
 Volcano Bay, Orlando (part of Universal Orlando)

Georgia 
 Great Wolf Lodge, LaGrange
Helen Water Park, Helen
High Falls Water Park, Jackson
 Lanier Islands Beach and Water Park, Buford
 Rigby's Water World, Warner Robins
Sandy Beach, Macon
Seven Springs, Powder Springs
 Six Flags Hurricane Harbor, Austell
 Six Flags White Water, Marietta
 SOAKya Water Park, Rossville
Southern Pines Water Park, Dublin
 Splash in the Boro, Statesboro
 Splash Island, Valdosta
 Summer Waves, Jekyll Island

Hawaii 
 Aulani, Kapolei
 Wet'n'Wild Hawaii, Kapolei

Idaho 
 Boulder Beach, Athol
 Lava Hot Springs Waterpark, Lava Hot Springs
 Raptor Reef, Hayden
 Rexburg Rapids, Rexburg
 Roaring Springs Water Park, Meridian
 Silver Rapids, Kellogg

Illinois 
 Collinsville Aqua Park, Collinsville
 Cypress Cove Family Aquatic Park, Woodridge
 Dolphin Cove Family Aquatic Center, Carpentersville
 Great Wolf Lodge, Gurnee
 Grizzly Jack's Grand Bear Resort, North Utica
 Key Lime Cove's Lost Paradise, Gurnee
 Knight's Action Park, Springfield
 Six Flags Hurricane Harbor Rockford, Cherry Valley
 Mystic Waters, Des Plaines
 Paradise Bay Water Park, Lombard
 Pelican Harbor Waterpark, Bolingbrook
 Philips Park Family Aquatic Center, Aurora
 Pirate's Cay, Sheridan
 Rainbow Falls Water Park, Elk Grove Village
 Pirates Cove, Elk Grove Village
 Raging Rivers, Grafton
 Raging Waves, Yorkville
 Six Flags Hurricane Harbor, Gurnee
 Splash Country, Aurora
 Splash Valley Aquatic Park, Kankakee
 White Water Canyon, Tinley Park

Indiana 

 Atlantis Water Park, Clarksville
 Big Splash Adventure, French Lick
 Deep River Waterpark, Crown Point
 Ideal Beach, Elkhart
 Indiana Beach, Monticello
 Kennedy Water Park, South Bend
 Kokomo Beach Family Aquatic Center, Kokomo
 Pine Lake, Berne
 Splash House, Marion
 Splashin' Safari, Santa Claus
 Splash Island, Plainfield
 Thunder Island, Westfield
 Tropicanoe Cove, Lafayette
 Yogi Bear's Jellystone Park WaterFun, Fremont

Iowa 
 Adventureland, Altoona
 Grand Harbor Resort and Waterpark, Dubuque
 King's Pointe, Storm Lake
 Lost Island Water Park, Waterloo
 The Beach Ottumwa, Ottumwa
 Wasserbahn Indoor Waterpark, Williamsburg

Kansas 
 Great Wolf Lodge, Kansas City
Long Branch Lagoon, Dodge City
Parrot Cover, Garden City
 Rock River Rapids, Derby

Kentucky 
 Kentucky Kingdom and Hurricane Bay, Louisville
 Kentucky Splash Waterpark, Williamsburg
 SomerSplash Waterpark, Somerset
 Splash Lagoon Water Park, Bowling Green (part of Beech Bend Park)
 Venture River Water Park, Eddyville

Louisiana 
 Blue Bayou, Baton Rouge
 Liberty Lagoon, Baton Rouge
 SPAR Waterpark, Sulphur
 Splash Kingdom Waterpark, Shreveport

Maine 
 Aquaboggan, Saco
 Funtown Splashtown USA, Saco
 Wild Acadia, Trenton

Maryland 
 Jolly Roger's Splash Mountain, Ocean City
 Six Flags Hurricane Harbor, Largo

Massachusetts 

 Aqua Lagoon Waterpark, Springfield
 Breezy Picnic Grounds Waterslides, Douglas
 Cape Codder Water Park, Barnstable
 Great Wolf Lodge, Fitchburg
 Six Flags Hurricane Harbor, Agawam
 Water Park of New England, Middleton
 Water Wizz, Wareham
 Wicked Waves Water Park, Yarmouth

Michigan 
 Adventure Island Family Fun Park, Cadillac
 Avalanche Bay, Boyne Falls
 Bavarian Inn Lodge, Frankenmuth
 Bridge Vista Beach Hotel, Mackinaw City
 East Lansing Family Aquatic Center, East Lansing
 Full Blast, Battle Creek
 Great Wolf Lodge, Traverse City
 Island Resort & Casino, Harris
 Rolling Hills Water Park, Ypsilanti
 Soaring Eagle Waterpark and Hotel, Mount Pleasant
 Splash Universe, Dundee
 Wyndham Garden Sterling Heights
 WildWater Adventure, Muskegon (part of Michigan's Adventure)

Minnesota 

 Cascade Bay, Eagan
 Soak City, Shakopee
 Great Wolf Lodge, Bloomington
 Venetian Indoor Water Park, Maple Grove
 Water Park of America, Bloomington
 Wild Mountain Waterslides, Taylor Falls

Mississippi 
 Barnacle Bill's Water Park and Mini Golf, Waveland
 Flint Creek Water Park, Wiggins
 Geyser Falls, Choctaw
 Gulf Islands Waterpark, Gulfport

Missouri 
 Adventure Oasis, Independence
 Aquaport, Maryland Heights
 Big Surf, Lake of the Ozarks
 Castle Rock Resort, Branson
 Farmington Water Park, Farmington
 Grand Country Resort, Branson
 Cape Splash Family Aquatic Center, Cape Girardeau
 Oceans of Fun, Kansas City
 Six Flags Hurricane Harbor, Eureka
 Splash Landing, Monroe City
 Summit Waves, Lee's Summit
 Tan-Tar-A Resort, Osage Beach
 The Bay Water Park, Kansas City
 White Water, Branson

Montana 
 Big Sky Water Park, Columbia Falls
 Electric City Water Park, Great Falls
 The Reef Indoor Water Park, Billings

Nebraska 
 AquaVenture. Norfolk
 Fun-Plex, Omaha
Pawnee Plunge, Columbus
Island Oasis, Grand Island

Nevada 
 Cowabunga Bay, Henderson
 Wet'n'Wild Las Vegas, Spring Valley
 Wild Island, Sparks

New Hampshire 
 Attitash Mountain Resort, Bartlett
 Candia Springs Adventure Park, Candia
 Castaway Island at Canobie Lake Park, Salem
 Clark's Bears, Lincoln
 Kahuna Laguna, North Conway
 Santa's Village, Jefferson
 Water Country, Portsmouth
 Whale's Tale Water Park, Lincoln

New Jersey 
 Breakwater Beach, Seaside Heights
 Clementon Park & Splash World, Clementon
 CoCo Key Water Resort, Mt. Laurel
 DreamWorks Water Park, East Rutherford
 Funplex, Mount Laurel
 Mountain Creek Waterpark, Vernon Township
 Land of Make Believe, Hope
 Ocean Oasis Water Park and Beach Club, Wildwood
 OC Waterpark, Ocean City
 Raging Waters Water Park, Wildwood
 Runaway Rapids Waterpark, Keansburg
 Big Kahuna's, West Berlin(Formerly Sahara Sam's)
 Six Flags Hurricane Harbor, Jackson
 SplashPlex, East Hanover
 Splash Zone Water Park, Wildwood
 Thundering Surf Waterpark, Beach Haven
 The Water Main, West Berlin

New Mexico 
 Cliff's Amusement Park, Albuquerque
 White's City Resort & Waterpark, White's City

New York 

 Enchanted Forest Water Safari, Old Forge
 The Great Escape & Splashwater Kingdom, Queensbury
 Roseland Waterpark, Canandaigua
 Seabreeze Raging Rivers, Rochester
 Six Flags Great Escape Lodge, Queensbury
 Splashdown Beach, Fishkill
 Splish Splash, Riverhead
 Palm Island Indoor Waterpark, Batavia
 Six Flags Hurricane Harbor, Darien
 Thunder Island, Fulton
 Zoom Flume, East Durham

North Carolina 
 Carolina Harbor, Charlotte
 Fantasy Lake, Hope Mills
 Great Wolf Lodge, Concord
 H2OBX, Powells Point
 Jungle Rapids, Wilmington
 Lions Water Adventure, Kinston
 Ray's Splash Planet, Charlotte
 Splasheville, Asheville
 Wet 'n Wild Emerald Pointe, Greensboro

North Dakota 
 Raging Rivers Water Park, Bismarck
 Roosevelt Park (Minot), Minot
 Splash Down Dakota Water Park, Minot
 Splasher's of the South Seas at Canad Inns, Grand Forks
 Williston ARC, Williston

Ohio 
 Adventure Reef Water Park, Kettering
 Akron Canton Jellystone Park, Uniontown
 Baylor Beach Park, Beach City
 Black Beard's Bay Waterpark, Edgerton
 Big Splash, Grove City
 Bowling Green City Pool & Waterpark, Bowling Green
 Castaway Bay, Sandusky
 Cedar Point Shores, Sandusky
 Clay's Park Resort, Canal Fulton
 Comfort Inn Splash Harbor, Bellville
 Coshocton Lake Park Recreational Complex, Coshocton
 Fairfield Aquatic Center, Fairfield, Ohio
 Funtimes Fun Park, Alliance
 Great Wolf Lodge, Mason
 Great Wolf Lodge, Sandusky
 Groveport Aquatic Center, Groveport
 Hall of Fame Resort, Canton (Opening 2022)
 Kalahari Resort and Convention Center, Sandusky
 Kroger Aquatic Center, Kroger
 Lincoln Park Family Aquatic Center, Marion
 Long's Retreat Family Resort, Latham
 Main Street Aquatic Center, Eaton, Ohio
 Marietta Aquatic Center, Marietta
 Mt Healthy City Pool, Mt Healthy
 Nelsonville Water Park, Nelsonville
 Pioneer Waterland & Dry Fun Park, Chardon
 Roof Park Pool, Maumee
 Soak City, Mason
 The Beach at Adventure Landing, Mason
 The Watering Hole Safari and Waterpark, Port Clinton
 Troy Aquatic Park, Troy
 Twinsburg Water Park, Twinsburg
 Uhrichsville Water Park, Uhrichsville
 Wapakoneta WaterPark, Wapakoneta
 Zoombezi Bay, Powell

Oklahoma 
 Comanche Nation Waterpark, Lawton
 Frontier City, Oklahoma City
 Safari Joe's H2O Water Park, Tulsa
 SplashZone, Enid
 Sun-n-Fun Waterpark, Ponca City
 Water-Zoo Clinton Indoor Water Park, Clinton
 White Water Bay, Oklahoma City

Oregon 
 Evergreen Wings and Waves Waterpark, McMinnville
 North Clackamas Aquatic Park, Milwaukie
 SHARC, Sunriver
 Splash! at Lively Park, Springfield

Pennsylvania 
 Aquatopia (Pennsylvania), Tannersville
 Carousel Water and Fun Park, Beach Lake, Pennsylvania
 Camelbeach Waterpark, Tannersville
 DelGrosso's Amusement Park, Tipton
 Dutch Wonderland, Lancaster
 Great Wolf Lodge, Pocono Mountains
 Idlewild and Soak Zone, Ligonier
 Kalahari Resort and Convention Center, Pocono Mountains
 Knoebels Amusement Resort, Elysburg
 Lakemont Park, Altoona
 Montage Mountain Waterpark, Scranton
 Sandcastle Waterpark, Pittsburgh
 Sesame Place, Langhorne
 Splash Lagoon, Erie
 Split Rock Resort, Lake Harmony
 The Boardwalk at Hersheypark, Hershey
 Waldameer Park, Erie
 WildRiver Waterpark, Entriken
 Wildwater Kingdom, Allentown

Rhode Island 
 Yawhoo Valley Ski Area & Water Park, Exeter

South Carolina 
 Myrtle Waves, Myrtle Beach
 Wild Water & Wheels, Surfside Beach

South Dakota 
 Evan's Plunge Indoor Pool & Mineral Spa, Hot Springs
 WaTiki Indoor Waterpark, Rapid City
 Wild Water West, Sioux Falls

Tennessee 
 Dollywood's Splash Country, Pigeon Forge
 Nashville Shores, Nashville
 Ober Gatlinburg, Gatlinburg
 Soaky Mountain, Servierville
 Wild Bear Falls Water Park, Gatlinburg
 Wilderness at the Smokies, Sevierville

Texas 

 Aquatica, San Antonio
 Bahama Beach, Dallas
 Boomtown Bay, Burke
 Castaway Cove, Wichita Falls
 Epic Waters Indoor Waterpark, Grand Prairie
 Great Wolf Lodge, Grapevine
 Hawaiian Falls, Garland, The Colony, Mansfield, Roanoke, and Waco
 Hurricane Alley Waterpark, Corpus Christi
 Kalahari Resort and Convention Center, Round Rock
 Lubbock Water Rampage, Lubbock
 Joyland Amusement Park, Lubbock
 Morgan's Inspiration Island, San Antonio
 NRH2O Family Water Park, North Richland Hills
 Palm Beach at Moody Gardens, Galveston (part of Moody Gardens)
 Pirates Bay Waterpark, Baytown
 Schlitterbahn, Galveston
 Schlitterbahn, New Braunfels
 Six Flags Hurricane Harbor, Arlington
 Six Flags Hurricane Harbor SplashTown, Spring
 Splash Kingdom Waterpark, Canton, Greenville, and Nacogdoches
 Splash Kingdom Wild West, Weatherford
 Splashtown San Antonio, San Antonio
 Splashway, Sheridan
 Surf and Swim, Garland
 Typhoon Texas, Austin
 Typhoon Texas, Katy
 Wet N' Wild Waterworld, Anthony
 Volente Beach, Leander
 Water Works Park, Denton
 Waves Resort Corpus Christi, Corpus Christi
 White Water Bay, San Antonio
 ZDT's Amusement Park, Seguin

Utah 

 Cherry Hill Resort, Kaysville
 Cowabunga Bay, Draper
 Lagoon-A-Beach, Farmington
 Seven Peaks Water Park, Salt Lake City (Permanently Closed)
 Splash Summit Water Park, Provo

Vermont 
 Smugglers' Notch Water Park, Jeffersonville
 Pump House Indoor Waterpark, Jay

Virginia 

 Atlantis Waterpark, Centreville
 Great Waves Waterpark, Alexandria
 Great Wolf Lodge, Williamsburg
 Massanutten Waterpark, McGaheysville
Maui Jack's Waterpark, Chincoteague
 Ocean Breeze Waterpark, VirginiaBeach
 Ocean Dunes Waterpark, Arlington
 Pirates Cove Waterpark, Lorton
 Splash Down Waterpark, Manassas
 Splash Valley Waterpark, Roanoke
 Volcano Island Waterpark, Sterling
 Water Country USA, Williamsburg
Water Mine Family Swimmin' Hole, Reston
 Soak City, Doswell

Washington 
 Birch Bay Waterslides, Blaine
 Great Wolf Lodge, Grand Mound
 Slidewaters, Chelan
 Splashdown Waterpark, Spokane Valley
 Wild Waves, Federal Way

West Virginia 
 Waves of Fun, Hurricane

Wisconsin 
 Alakai Resort, Wisconsin Dells
 Atlantis Waterpark Hotel, Wisconsin Dells
 Breaker Bay Waterpark, Sheboygan (part of Blue Harbor Resort)
 Carousel Inn, Wisconsin Dells
 Chaos Water Park, Eau Claire
 Chula Vista Resort, Wisconsin Dells
 Cranberry Country Lodge, Tomah
 Crawdaddy Cove Water Park, Madison
 Grand Lodge Waterpark Resort, Rothschild
 Grand Marquis Resort, Wisconsin Dells
 Great Wolf Lodge, Wisconsin Dells
 Holiday Inn Express Wisconsin Dells, Baraboo
 Kalahari Resort and Convention Center, Wisconsin Dells
 Meadowbrook Resort, Wisconsin Dells
 Mt. Olympus Water & Theme Park, Wisconsin Dells
 New Concord Inn, Wisconsin Dells
 Noah's Ark, Wisconsin Dells
 Polynesian Resort Hotel, Wisconsin Dells
 RainTree Waterpark Resort, Wisconsin Dells
 Ramada Plaza Hotel Indoor Water Park, Green Bay
 SkyLine Indoor Water Park and Hotel, Wisconsin Dells
 The Springs Water Park, Pewaukee
 Three Bears Lodge, Warrens
 Timber Ridge Lodge, Lake Geneva
 Tundra Lodge, Green Bay
 Waters of Minoqua, Minoqua
 Wilderness Territory, Wisconsin Dells
 Wintergreen Resort, Wisconsin Dells
 Wisconsin Rapids Aquatic Center, Wisconsin Rapids

Wyoming 
 Casper Family Aquatic Center, Casper
 Cheyenne Aquatic Center, Cheyenne
 Gillette Recreation Pool, Gillette
 Hellie's Tepee Pool, Thermopolis
 Pinedale Aquatic Center, Pinedale
 Star Plunge, Thermopolis

South America

Argentina 
 Aquapolis, Mar del Plata, Buenos Aires
 Aquasol, Mar del Plata, Buenos Aires
 Aquafun, Tigre, Buenos Aires

Brazil 
 Magic City
Beach Park, Fortaleza, Ceará
 Foz do Iguazu
 Porto Seguro
 Veneza Water Park, Paulista, Pernambuco

Colombia

Antioquia 
 Aeropark Juan Pablo II, Medellín
 Kanaloa Water Park, Santa Fe de Antioquia
 Ditaires Complex, Itagui
 Parque Comfama Rionegro, Rionegro
 Parque Comfama Itagüi, Itagui
 Parque Comfama La Estrella, La Estrella
 Parque Comfama Arví, Medellín
 Parque Comfama San Ignacio, Medellín
 Parque Comfama Aranjuez, Medellín
 Parque Comfama Barrio Perez, Bello
 Parque Comfama Centro, Bello
 Parque Los Tamarindos, San Jerónimo

Bolivar 
 Takurika Recreational Center, Cartagena

Cundinamarca 
 CiCi Aquapark, Bogotá
 Las Palmeras Vacay Center, Villeta
 CODEMA Park, Villeta
 Mosquera Water Park, Mosquera

Huila 
 Juncal Beach, Palermo, Huila

Meta 
 Parque Cacayal, Castilla la Nueva

Santander 
 Cable Wake Park, Barrancabermeja

Tolima 

 Piscilago, Melgar
 Lagosol, Melgar
 Inflaparque Ikarus, Melgar
 Parque Nacional del Agua, Melgar

Valle del Cauca 
 De la Caña Aquapark, Cali

Paraguay 
 Rakiura, Asunción
 Parque Acuático El Dorado, Encarnación

Peru
 Los Toboganes de las Tres Ruedas, Puente Piedra

Uruguay 
 Acuamania, Salto

Venezuela 
 Parque de Agua Kariña, Puerto la Cruz
 Playa Cuare, Falcón

See also 
 List of water parks
 List of amusement parks
 List of amusement parks in the Americas

References

External links 
 Ultimate Waterpark.com – directory and guide to water parks in North America

Lists of amusement parks
 
Americas-related lists
North America-related lists
South America-related lists
Lists of buildings and structures in North America
Lists of buildings and structures in South America